Jay D. Jensen is a retired United States Air Force major general who last served as Special Assistant to the Commander, Air Force Reserve Command from March 2022 to June 2022. He most recently served as the Director of Strategic Plans, Programs and Requirements of the Air Force Reserve Command and prior to that served as the Mobilization Assistant to the Director of Air Force Reserve Plans, Programs, and Requirements of the United States Air Force.

References

External links
 

Year of birth missing (living people)
Living people
Place of birth missing (living people)
United States Air Force generals